Me Before You is a romance novel written by Jojo Moyes. The book was first published on 5 January 2012 in the United Kingdom. A sequel titled After You was released on 24 September 2015 through Pamela Dorman Books.
A second sequel, Still Me, was published in January 2018.

Plot

Twenty-six-year-old Louisa Clark lives with her working-class family. Unambitious and with few qualifications, she feels constantly outshone by her younger sister, Treena, an outgoing single mother. Louisa, who helps support her family, loses her job at a local café when the café closes. She goes to the Job Center and, after several failed attempts, is offered a unique employment opportunity: help care for Will Traynor, a successful, wealthy, and once-active young man who has quadriplegia as a result of a pedestrian-motorcycle accident two years earlier. Will's mother, Camilla, hires Louisa despite her lack of experience, believing Louisa can brighten his spirit. Louisa meets Nathan, who cares for Will's medical needs, and Will's father, Steven, a friendly upper-class businessman whose marriage to Camilla is strained.

Louisa and Will's relationship starts out rocky due to his bitterness and resentment over being disabled. Things worsen after Will's ex-girlfriend, Alicia, and best friend Rupert reveal that they are getting married. Under Louisa's care, Will gradually becomes more communicative and open-minded as they share experiences together. Louisa notices Will's scarred wrists and later overhears his mother and father discussing how he attempted suicide shortly after Camilla refused his request to end his life through Dignitas, a Swiss-based assisted suicide organization. Horrified by his attempt, Camilla promised to honor her son's wish, but only if he agreed to live six more months. Camilla intends to prove that, in time, he will believe his life's worth living.

Louisa conceals knowing about Will and Camilla's agreement. However, she tells Treena, and together they devise ways that will help convince Will to abandon his death wish. Over the next few weeks, Will loosens up and Louisa begins taking him on outings and the two grow closer.

Through their frequent talks, Louisa learns that Will has traveled extensively; his favorite place is a café in Paris. Noticing how limited his life is now and that he has few ambitions, Louisa tries to motivate Will to change.

Louisa continues seeing her longtime boyfriend of 7 years, Patrick, though they eventually break up due to her relationship with Will. Meanwhile, Louisa's father loses his job, causing more financial difficulties. Steven Traynor offers Mr. Clark a position. Louisa realizes that Will is trying to help her secure her freedom from her family. The two attend Alicia and Rupert's wedding where they dance and flirt. Will tells Louisa that she is the only reason he wakes in the morning.

Louisa convinces Will to go on a holiday with her, but before they can leave, Will contracts near-fatal pneumonia. Louisa cancels the plans for a whirlwind trip. Instead, she takes Will to the island of Mauritius. The night before returning home, Louisa tells Will that she loves him. Will says he wants to confide something, but she admits that she already knows about his plans with Dignitas. Will says their time together has been special, but he cannot bear to live in a wheelchair. He will be following through with his plans. Angry and hurt, Louisa storms off and does not speak to him for the remainder of the trip. When they return home, Will's parents are pleasantly surprised by his good physical condition. Louisa, however, resigns as his caretaker, and they understand that Will intends to end his life.

Back at home Louisa is miserable and her mother is outraged when Louisa tells them everything about Will. The media and journalists arrive at the house having been tipped off by Patrick and the family become isolated. Treena then finds a message from Camilla Traynor requesting Louisa to come to Switzerland. Louisa accepts despite her mother forbidding it and flies out to see Will. Once reunited again at the clinic they agree that the past six months have been the best in their lives. He dies shortly after in the clinic, and it is revealed that he left Louisa a considerable inheritance, meant to continue her education and to fully experience life. The novel ends with Louisa at a café in Paris, reading Will's last words to her in a letter, that tell her to 'live well'.

Characters
 Louisa Clark – a 26-year-old woman who is creative, talented, and funny but underestimates herself and has few ambitions. Her life changes when she begins working as a caretaker for a paralysed man. Over time, she learns to harness her capabilities and step out of her limited comfort zone.
 William (Will) Traynor – a 35-year-old man who became quadriplegic after being hit by a motorbike. He is intelligent and wealthy, but his impairment has left him moody, angry, and bitter. Unable to accept never being the active and adventurous man he once was, he wants to end his life.
 Camilla Traynor – Will's mother who has a strained relationship with her son. She is severe and strict but she cares about her son's well-being.
 Steven Traynor – Will's father who was mostly absent from his children's lives; Camilla Traynor blames him for destroying their family. He wants to divorce Camilla.
 Katrina (Treena) Clark – Louisa's younger sister who is a single mother to son Thomas. Treena works at a flower shop, and has always been regarded as the most intelligent sibling. Even though the sisters have always been competitive, they support each other.
 Patrick – Louisa's boyfriend who works as a personal trainer. He is obsessed with sports and diet.
 Nathan – Will's nurse and caretaker who is also his friend.
 Bernard Clark – Lou's father, worked as a furniture craftsman before being laid off and ultimately works maintenance for the castle
 Josephine – Lou's mother, who spends her days caring for Thomas, Treena's son, and cleaning
 Alicia Dewar – Will's ex-girlfriend who marries his colleague, Rupert. She is beautiful and delicate, but lives her life according to the standards of upper society.
 Georgina Traynor – Will's sister who lives and works in Australia, she resents Will for his desire to die
 Rupert Freshwell – An old friend of Will's from work. He marries Will's old girlfriend, Alicia.
 Frank – Louisa's previous employer at the bakery where she worked before meeting Will.
 Thomas – Louisa's young nephew and the son of her sister Katrina, a single mother.
 Major Timothy Dewar – Alicia Dewar's father.

Reception
The book was placed on the Richard and Judy Book Club.

Disability advocates have criticised the book and film for suggesting that life may not be worth living for some with severe disabilities.

Film adaptation

In 2014 MGM announced it would make a film adaptation of Me Before You, to be directed by Thea Sharrock and released via Warner Bros. The film was initially set to release in August 2015 but was pushed back to 3 June 2016.

Emilia Clarke and Sam Claflin portray the main characters. The film has grossed over $200 million worldwide.

References

External links

 Me Before You on Penguin Books site
 Jojo Moyes official website

2012 British novels
British novels adapted into films
British romance novels
Death in Switzerland
Michael Joseph books
Fiction about suicide
Literature by women
Contemporary romance novels